The Wyoming United States House election for 1990 was held on November 6, 1990. The incumbent Representative Craig L. Thomas won his first regular election after winning the special election to fill the empty seat of Dick Cheney. Thomas defeated Pete Maxfield with 55.09% of the vote.

Results

References

Wyoming
1990
1990 Wyoming elections